This is a list of seasons completed by the Memphis Grizzlies of the National Basketball Association (NBA). The team was founded in 1995 as the Vancouver Grizzlies as one of two franchises that joined the NBA for the 1995–96 season. The Grizzlies moved to Memphis after the 2000–01 season.

Table key

Seasons

All-time records

References

 
seasons
Events in Memphis, Tennessee